"Chasin' the Wind" is a rock ballad song written by Diane Warren and recorded by the band Chicago, for their 1991 studio album Twenty 1, featuring Bill Champlin on vocals. The song was produced and engineered by Ron Nevison and mixed by Humberto Gatica. "Chasin' the Wind" was released as the first single from Twenty 1 in January 1991. Its B-side is the song "Only Time Can Heal the Wounded".

"Chasin' the Wind" peaked at No. 13 on the Billboard Adult Contemporary chart and No. 39 on the Billboard Hot 100. It is the band's last top 40 hit to date (although they have made subsequent appearances on the Adult Contemporary chart).

Charts

References

1990 songs
1991 singles
Chicago (band) songs
Songs written by Diane Warren
Song recordings produced by Ron Nevison
Rock ballads
1990s ballads
Full Moon Records singles
Reprise Records singles